Lumbini Sanskritik is a municipality situated in Rupandehi District of Lumbini Province in Nepal. Lumbini, the Buddhist pilgrimage site where Buddha was born lies in the center of this municipality.

This Lumbini Cultural Municipality was formed merging the existing Lumbini Adarsha Village development committee to six other Village Development Committees i.e. Bhagawanpur, Tenahawa, Ekala, Khudabazar, Madhuwani, Masina. The municipality is divided into 13 wards. The municipality is located at 18 km of distance from the district headquarters of Siddharthanagar.

References

Populated places in Rupandehi District
Municipalities in Lumbini Province
Nepal municipalities established in 2014